Athletico Physical Therapy is an Oak Brook, Illinois-based chain offering orthopedic rehabilitation originally founded in 1991 by physical therapist  Mark Kaufman. The company  started by providing rehabilitation services for student athletes at   Francis W. Parker High School and Lions Rugby in Chicago. The company currently has over 500 locations in 12 states and more than 5,000 employees. Athletico is majority owned by BDT Capital Partners of Chicago. 

In  June  2019 Athletico Physical Therapy  named  former Fresenius Medical Care executive Ron Rodgers as the new CEO, while founder Mark Kaufman remained on as executive chairman.

In October 2019 Khymberly Booth was named as the organization's chief human resource officer.  In early 2020 Ben Jacobs was named as the organization's chief development officer. 

Athletico Physical Therapy is rated an average of 3.5 out of 5 in 291 reviews by current and former employees on Glassdoor.

See also
Physical therapist
Occupational therapist
ATI Physical Therapy

References

External links

Rehabilitation medicine
Physical therapy
Sports medicine
1991 establishments in Illinois
Oak Brook, Illinois